The Imagine Film Festival, formerly Amsterdam Fantastic Film Festival (AFFF), also known as Imagine Fantastic Film Festival or simply Imagine, is an annual film festival in Amsterdam, Netherlands. The festival was created in 1991 as the Amsterdam Fantastic Film Festival, with a focus mainly on fantasy and horror films, before changing its name in 2009.

History
Imagine started out as the "Weekend of Terror". After several years, this weekend turned into a full-blown festival in 1991, titled the Amsterdam Fantastic Film Festival (AFFF). It showed a wide array of international genre films, not just horror but also sci-fi, fantasy, martial arts and anime.

In 2004 the AFFF hosted the Golden Méliès Gala (best European fantastic long and short films).

In 2009, the festival got a new name: Imagine Film Festival. With the name change, the organization wanted to emphasize that the festival had become more focused on films that cannot be strictly defined as fantasy, horror or science fiction over the years.

In 2013, after many years based at the Kriterion, the festival chose the EYE Film Institute as its home base. During the years at Eye, the festival started adding VR experiences as well as games, under the flag of "Imagine Expanded", and extended its science programme.

In 2022, both the timing and the venues were changed: to the end of October instead of mid-April, and at two new base venues.

Description
Imagine takes place at the end of October, at LAB11 and de Filmhallen, both in the western part of Amsterdam.

The festival aims to acquaint both film lovers and the general public with a selection of new and classic films from genres such as fantasy, horror and science fiction. A large part of the program consists of genre films, exploitation films, cult films and obscure films, though the offerings have become increasingly diverse over the years.

The event is organized by the Foundation AFFF for no profit and receives subsidies from the Film Fund and the City of Amsterdam.

Prizes awarded at the festival include:
Lifetime / Career Achievement Award 
 Silver Scream Award
 Méliès (Silver and Gold)
 The Black Tulip Award
 Imagine Time Capsule
 VR Award

Prizewinners

Lifetime/Career Achievement Award
The Lifetime/Career Achievement Award has been awarded to the following people:
 2014 - Alejandro Jodorowsky (Career Achievement Award)
 2013 - Neil Jordan
 2012 - Stan Lee
 2011 - Rutger Hauer
 2010 - Dick Maas
 2008 - Tim Burton (Career Achievement Award)
 2007 - Terry Gilliam (Career Achievement Award)
 2006 - Roger Corman
 2005 - Ray Harryhausen
 2005 - Paul Naschy
 2004 - not awarded
 2003 - Lloyd Kaufman
 2002 - Paul Verhoeven
 2001 - Dario Argento
 2000 - Wes Craven

Silver Scream Award
The Silver Scream Award is voted for by the audience of the festival.

Méliès Awards
The Méliès Awards are an initiative of the Méliès International Festivals Federation (formerly European Fantastic Film Festivals Federation, or EFFFF), of which Imagine has been a member since 1996. Affiliated festivals each year grant two Silver Méliès Award during their festival,  one for the best long and one for the best short film fantastic. The winners then join the Méliès d'Or Award ceremony.
Amsterdam Méliès winners:

Amsterdam Méliès-winners:

Black Tulip Award 
In 2006 set jury prize, the Black Tulip Award, in 2006 was awarded in three categories, but then only in the category of Best Feature:

Imagine Time Capsule
This prize was awarded for online entries between 2010 and 2015:

References

External links

Film festivals in the Netherlands